CKMB-FM is a Canadian radio station, broadcasting at 107.5 FM in Barrie, Ontario. The station airs music in the hot adult contemporary format. The station was launched in 2001 by Central Ontario Broadcasting (Rock 95 Broadcasting (Barrie-Orillia) Ltd.), the owners of CFJB. It was launched as Star 107.5.

CKMB's call letters were taken from station owner Doug Bingley's desire to name the station after his children, Michael, Matthew and Megan Bingley. He had originally wanted to use the call letters for CFJB when that station was launched in 1988, although the call sign was not available at that time.

On August 20, 2004, the CRTC approved Rock 95's application to change CKMB's frequency to 107.7 MHz and to change the authorized contours by relocating the transmitter. The change to 107.7 MHz was never implemented.

In December 2005, CKMB rebranded from Star 107.5 to 107.5 Kool FM and began more current/recurrent airplay over classic airplay.

References

External links
 107.5 Kool FM
 

Kmb
Kmb
Radio stations established in 2001
2001 establishments in Ontario